Marvin Dirk Bakalorz (born 13 September 1989) is a German professional footballer who plays as a midfielder for MSV Duisburg.

Career
In May 2016, Bakalorz joined Hannover 96 on a free transfer from SC Paderborn. He left the club in August 2020 having agreed the termination of his contract which was due to expire in summer 2022.

After playing one season for Turkish club Denizlispor, German 3. Liga side MSV Duisburg announced the signing of Bakalorz in late May 2021, starting with the new season.

Career statistics

References

External links

Living people
1989 births
Sportspeople from Offenbach am Main
Association football midfielders
German footballers
Bundesliga players
2. Bundesliga players
3. Liga players
Regionalliga players
Süper Lig players
Borussia Dortmund players
Borussia Dortmund II players
MSV Duisburg players
Eintracht Frankfurt players
Eintracht Frankfurt II players
Hannover 96 players
SC Paderborn 07 players
SC Preußen Münster players
Denizlispor footballers
Footballers from Hesse
Expatriate footballers in Turkey
German expatriate sportspeople in Turkey
German expatriate footballers